Mount Prevost is a mountain on Vancouver Island, British Columbia, Canada. It is northwest of Duncan and has a distinctive skyline with the two rock bluffs. On top of the highest north bluff is a war memorial.

History
The mountain was featured in the legends of the creation of the Cowichan First Nation. During the Great Flood one man took refuge on top of Swuqus or Swukas (Prevost) while all the others died. In Sooke, there were two women who also stayed on high ground to escape the waters. When the waters receded they moved up island and found the lone Cowichan man. These three people are the ancestors of the Cowichan tribe.

The mount's modern name is a tribute to Captain James Charles Prevost,  RN, who served aboard  and was British Commissioner in the San Juan Islands boundary dispute also known as The Pig War.

The forest became part of a Municipal Forest established in 1946.

Access
The mountain is open all year except during periods of high fire hazard. Some of the roads have gates and these may be closed at certain times. There are many trails on the mountain, but none were built or are maintained by the municipality of North Cowichan.  There are expansive views of the Gulf Islands and Cowichan Valley from the mountain. It has been used as a launching site for hang gliding, complete with a wind sock. 

Mount Prevost can be reached from Mt. Prevost Road off Somenos Road. The road to the summit is about 8 kilometres or 20 minutes long.

References

External links
 Guide to Mount Prevost, Municipality of North Cowichan

Landforms of Vancouver Island
Mountains of British Columbia under 1000 metres
Cowichan Valley
Cowichan Land District